Hasta que la plata nos separe (English: Til Money Do Us Part) is a Colombian telenovela produced by RCN Televisión, that aired on Canal RCN from 10 May 2022 to 16 September 2022. It is an adaptation of the 2006 Colombian telenovela of the same name written by Fernando Gaitán. The series stars Sebastián Martínez and Carmen Villalobos.

Plot 
Rafael Méndez (Sebastián Martínez) is an ethical and noble man who dedicates his life to selling household items and is dating his neighbor Vicky Pardo (Juliette Pardau). Alejandra Maldonado (Carmen Villalobos) is a successful businesswoman and manager of the Ramenautos car dealership, she is engaged to Luciano Valenzuela (Gregorio Pernía). Rafael and Alejandra suffer a car accident that will trigger a series of events that will bring them closer. Rafael must pay off the debt he has left Alejandra with after the accident and this closeness will lead them to fall in love despite their social differences. However, circumstances and their respective families and partners will do everything possible to prevent their love from happening.

Cast 
An extensive cast list was published on 23 February 2022 in a press release.

Main 
 Carmen Villalobos as Alejandra Maldonado
 Sebastián Martínez as Rafael Méndez
 Gregorio Pernía as Luciano Valenzuela
 Juliette Pardau as Vicky Pardo "La Pajarita"
 Laura Flores as Clemencia Maldonado
 Alejandro Tommasi as Benjamín Maldonado
 Lorna Cepeda as Rosaura Echeverri
 Marcela Benjumea as Martha Patricia Roncancio "La Generala"
 Julián Arango as Marino Castaño
 Michelle Roullard as Isabella
 Julio Sánchez as Simón Sanpedro "Bebé"
 Alejandra Ávila as Claudia Cruz
 Matías Maldonado as Ramiro Ramírez Rayo
 Alina Lozano as Leonor de Méndez
 Stephania Duque as Milena Méndez
 José Daniel Cristancho as Jaime Rincón
 Fernando Arévalo as Gastón Pardo
 Julián Caicedo as Franklin Pardo
 Rodrigo Jerez as Giovanny Pardo
 Fabián Ríos as Wilfer Fonseca "El Dandy"

Recurring 
 Sandra Ardila as Pepa
 Juan Mogollón as Arturo
 Juan Felipe Muñoz as Luis "Lucho" López
 Felipe Botero as Vicente Chávez
 Alejandro Gutiérrez as Ezequiel Bernal
 Jenny Lara as Josefina
 Tuto Patiño as Carlos Alberto Pinzón "Papeto"
 Eddy Hidalgo as Alberto
 Felipe Garay as Trapito
 Rashed Estefenn as Lorenzo Lizarralde
 Juliana Galvis as Karen Nicholls
 Oscar Marroquín as Casimiro

Production 
Filming of the telenovela began on 23 February 2022. The first teaser of the series was shown on 1 April 2022. Filming concluded in June 2022.

Ratings

Episodes

References

External links 
 

2022 telenovelas
2022 Colombian television series debuts
2022 Colombian television series endings
RCN Televisión telenovelas
Colombian telenovelas
Spanish-language telenovelas